Roberto Parada may refer to:

 Roberto Parada (painter) (born 1969), freelance illustrator
 Roberto Parada (actor) (1909–1986), Chilean actor, theater director and teacher